Volga is an unincorporated community in Smyrna Township, Jefferson County, Indiana. The name's origin is not known with certainty, but is believed to have been adopted from Volga in Russia. There were no Russian settlers in the area so the reason is not known.

Volga was not platted as a town and was never separately enumerated in federal censuses. It was defined primarily by the existence of a post office and a school. The post office operated from 
May 29, 1856 until July 14, 1904. The first postmaster was William J. Chambers.

School trustees purchased a tract in the area  on March 11, 1844 for the erection of a school house. A school house that was still standing in 1989 was built in 1870. In the immediate neighborhood is the Hopewell Baptist Church, a  stone building constructed in 1848. The History of Hopewell Baptist Church shows that the organizing meeting was held on May 16, 1829 at the house of Robert Ford. The first worship was held in July 1829 at Volga. The church, which still meets, is located at 3078 N Thompson Rd., Madison.

The 1890 Indiana Gazetteer and Business Directory provided the following description: "A village of 100 inhabitants in Smyrna township, Jefferson county, 9 miles northwest of Madison, Jefferson county, the county seat, nearest shipping point and bank location. Mail tri-weekly. George Wallace, postmaster."

Geography
The community is on the north side of Harbert's Creek, which flows from east to west, on the Deputy Pike at its junction with county road 700W.

References

Further reading
Baker, J. David, The Postal History of Indiana, 1976, Philatelic Bibliophile, P.O. Box 213971, Louisville, Ky. 1976.
Historic Landmarks Foundation of Indiana. Jefferson County Interim Report, Indiana Historical Sites and Structure Inventory Indianapolis, November 1989
History of the Hopewell Baptist Church. Madison-Jefferson County, Indiana, public library.
Polk, R.L. Co. Indiana State Gazetteer & Business Directory. 1890. Volume V. S.E. Circle and Meridian Streets, Indianapolis, Ind. Reprinted 1978-9 by The Bookmark, P.O. Box 74 Knightstown, Ind. 46148.

Unincorporated communities in Jefferson County, Indiana
Unincorporated communities in Indiana